Sultana sultana is a species from the genus Sultana. 

This species was first described by Lewis Weston Dillwyn in 1817.

Description 
Sultana sultana is a land snail. It has a shell height of 87.4 and a diameter 54.5 mm.

Habitat and range 
This species occurs widely across South America, findings have been documented in Panama, Colombia, Ecuador, Peru, Bolivia, Brazil, French Guiana, and Suriname. Recent observations through citizen science apps, confirm these documented recordings.

It has an habitat at low altitude and in moist forests.

References

 Massemin D., Lamy D., Pointier J.P. & Gargominy O. (2009). Coquillages et escargots de Guyane. Mèze: Biotope. 456 pp.

External links
 Dillwyn L.W. (1817). A descriptive catalogue of Recent shells, arranged according to the Linnean method; with particular attention to the synonymy. London: John and Arthur Arch. Vol. 1: 1-580; Vol. 2: 581-1092 + index
 Shuttleworth, R. J. (1856). Beiträge zur näheren Kenntniss der Mollusken. Notitiae Malacologicae. 1: 1-90, pls 1-9.
  Preston, H.B. (1914). New non-marine Mollusca from Peru and Argentina. The Annals and Magazine of Natural History, (8) 13 (77): 522-528. London.
 Breure, A. S. H. & Mogollón Avila, V. (2016). Synopsis of Central Andean orthalicoid land snails (Gastropoda, Stylommatophora), excluding Bulimulidae. ZooKeys. 588: 1-199

Taxa named by Lewis Weston Dillwyn
Orthalicidae
Fauna of Brazil
Fauna of Suriname
Fauna of Guyana
Fauna of French Guiana